Gunnar Jansson may refer to
Gunnar Jansson (footballer), Swedish association football player
Gunnar Jansson (athlete) (1897–1953), Swedish Olympic hammer thrower
Gunnar Janson (1901–1983), Norwegian sculptor